Cychrus grumulifer is a species of ground beetle in the subfamily of Carabinae. It was described by Deuve in 1993.

References

grumulifer
Beetles described in 1993